Chah Howz (also Romanized as Chāh Ḩowẕ, Chā Ḩowẕ, and Chāh Hauz) is a village in Baqeran Rural District, in the Central District of Birjand County, South Khorasan Province, Iran. At the 2006 census, its population was 81, in 34 families.

References 

Populated places in Birjand County